The Bay of Bengal Initiative for Multi-Sectoral Technical and Economic Cooperation (BIMSTEC) is an international organisation of seven South Asian and Southeast Asian nations, housing 1.73 billion people and having a combined gross domestic product of US$4.4 trillion (2022). The BIMSTEC member states – Bangladesh, Bhutan, India, Myanmar, Nepal, Sri Lanka, and Thailand – are among the countries dependent on the Bay of Bengal.

Fourteen priority sectors of cooperation have been identified and several BIMSTEC centres have been established to focus on those sectors. A BIMSTEC free trade agreement is under negotiation (c. 2018), also referred Similar to SAARC.

Leadership is rotated in alphabetical order of country names. The permanent secretariat is in Dhaka, Bangladesh.

Background 
On 6 June 1997, a new sub-regional grouping was formed in Bangkok under the name BIST-EC (Bangladesh, India, Sri Lanka, and Thailand Economic Cooperation). Following the inclusion of Myanmar on 22 December 1997 during a special Ministerial Meeting in Bangkok, the Group was renamed ‘BIMST-EC’ (Bangladesh, India, Myanmar, Sri Lanka and Thailand Economic Cooperation). In 1998, Nepal became an observer. In February 2004, Nepal and Bhutan  became full members.

On 31 July 2004, in the first Summit the grouping was renamed as BIMSTEC or the Bay of Bengal Initiative for Multi-Sectoral Technical and Economic Cooperation.

Objective 
There are 14 main sectors of BIMSTEC along technological and economic cooperation among South Asian and Southeast Asian countries along the coast of the Bay of Bengal.

 Trade & Investment
 Transport & Communication
 Energy
 Tourism
 Technology
 Fisheries
 Agriculture
 Public Health
 Poverty Alleviation
 Counter-Terrorism & Transnational Crime
 Environment & Disaster Management
 People-to-People Contact
 Cultural Cooperation
 Climate Change

Sectors 7 to 13 were added at the 8th Ministerial Meeting in Dhaka in 2005 while the 14th sector was added in 11th Ministerial Meeting in New Delhi in 2008.

Member nations are denoted as Lead Countries for each sector.
 Provides cooperation to one another for the provision of training and research facilities in educational vocational and technical fields
 Promote active collaboration and mutual assistance in economic, social, technical and scientific fields of common interest
 Provides help to increase the socio-economic growth of the member countries

Permanent Secretariat 
The BIMSTEC Permanent Secretariat at Dhaka was opened in 2014 and India contributes 32% of its expenditure. The current Secretary General of the BIMSTEC is Ambassador Tenzin Lekphell from Bhutan and the former Secretary General was M Shahidul Islam from Bangladesh. And First Secretary General was Sumith Nakandala from Sri Lanka.

Chairmanship 

The BIMSTEC uses the alphabetical order for the Chairmanship. The Chairmanship of the BIMSTEC has been taken in rotation commencing with Bangladesh (1997–1999).

Member nations

Heads of the member nations
Leaders are either heads of state or heads of government, depending on which is constitutionally the chief executive of the nation's government.

BIMSTEC priority sectors 
14 priority areas have been identified with the lead nations appointed to lead the effort:
The organisation has 15 priority areas for cooperation, including Trade & Investment, Transport & Communication, Energy, Tourism, Technology, Fisheries, Agriculture, Public Health, Poverty Alleviation, Counter-Terrorism & Transnational Crime, Environment & Disaster Management, People-to-People Contact, Cultural Cooperation, Climate Change and Blue Economy.

In a virtual BIMSTEC Colombo summit which took place on March 30, 2022, decision was taken to reduce, re-constitute and reconstruct the number of sectors of co-operation from the unwieldy 14 to a more manageable 7.
 Trade, Investment and Development - Bangladesh
 Environment and Climate Change - Bhutan
 Security and Energy - India
 Agriculture and Food Security - Myanmar
 People-to-people Contact - Nepal
 Science, Technology and Innovation - Sri Lanka
 Connectivity - Thailand

BIMSTEC Free Trade Area Framework Agreement 
The BIMSTEC Free Trade Area Framework Agreement (BFTAFA) has been signed by all member nations to stimulate trade and investment in the parties, and attract outsiders to trade with and invest in the BIMSTEC countries at a higher level. Subsequently, the "Trade Negotiating Committee" (TNC) was set up, with Thailand as the permanent chair, to negotiate in areas of trade in goods and services, investment, economic co-operation, trade facilitations and technical assistance for LDCs. Once negotiation on trade in goods is completed, the TNC would then proceed with negotiation on trade in services and investment.

The BIMSTEC Coastal Shipping Agreement draft was discussed on 1 December 2017 in New Delhi, to facilitate coastal shipping within 20 nautical miles of the coastline in the region to boost trade between the member countries. Compared to the deep sea shipping, coastal ship require smaller vessels with lesser draft and involve lower costs. Once the agreement becomes operational after it is ratified, a lot of cargo movement between the member countries can be done through the cost effective, environment friendly and faster coastal shipping routes.
The necessity for coastal shipping ecosystem and electricity grid interconnectivity, as two of the necessary components of the evolving shape of BIMSTEC.

On 7 and 8 November 2019, the first ever BIMSTEC Conclave of Ports summit was held in Visakhapatnam, India. The main aims of this summit is providing a platform to strengthen maritime interaction, port-led connectivity initiatives and sharing best practices among member countries.

In 2022 summit saw the declaration of the Master Plan for Transport Connectivity that would provide a framework for regional and domestic connectivity,

Cooperation with Asian Development Bank (ADB) 
The Asian Development Bank (ADB) becomes a partner in 2005, to undertake the "BIMSTEC Transport Infrastructure and Logistic Study" (BTILS), which was completed in 2014.

BIMSTEC Summits

Projects 
 Coast shipping
 Power grid interconnection
 Regional disaster monitoring and warning system
 Road and rail Look-East connectivity projects

See also 
 ASEAN & Look-East connectivity projects
 Asia Cooperation Dialogue
 Asian Clearing Union
 Asian Development Bank
 Bangladesh Bhutan India Nepal Initiative (BBIN)
 BRICS-BIMSTEC Summit, 2016
 Mekong-Ganga Cooperation
 South Asian Association for Regional Cooperation (SAARC)
 South Asia Subregional Economic Cooperation

Notes

References

External links
 
 BIMSTEC free trade agreement
 2018 BIMSTEC Summit

1997 establishments in Asia
International economic organizations
International organizations based in Asia
Organizations established in 1997
Foreign relations of Bangladesh
Foreign relations of Bhutan
Foreign relations of India
Foreign relations of Myanmar
Foreign relations of Nepal
Foreign relations of Sri Lanka
Foreign relations of Thailand
Bay of Bengal